Gonagolla Vihara (Sinhalaː ගොනාගොල්ල විහාරය) is an ancient cave temple situated in Ampara District, Sri Lanka. The vihara is also known as Punchi Seegiriya (Little Sigiriya) by the locals since the temple contains ancient frescoes similar to those in Sigiriya. The temple has been formally recognised by the government as an archaeological site in Sri Lanka. The designation was declared on 10 October 2014 under the government Gazette number 1884.

History

There is clear evidence that the rock caves of the temple were occupied by ancient Vedda people as their paintings can be found nearby in the rock caves.  Two more caves in the Vihara premises contains Brahmi rock inscriptions dating back to 3-5th centuries.

The remains of two ancient ponds, and the Stupa of Anuradhapura era, next to the frescoes cave, are examples of some constructions in the Vihara belong to the third century BC. Among other ruins a Vatadage, Chatra stones, remains of large scale buildings with carved stone pillars and rock stairways can be seen around the vihara premises.

Frescoes

In 1956 the Archaeological Department found out some remnants of frescoes belong to the 3rd century AD on the vaulted ceiling of a cave in Gonagolla temple. The frescoes have been drawn on a special plastered surface and depict a scene of a young female dancer and a man who is alleged to be a Bodhisattva. The female figure is almost identical to famous Sigiriya maidens (5th century) and both figures have been painted using red, yellow, green and white colors with sharp margins. Due to the frescoes, this temple is called Punchi Sigiriya (Little Sigiriya) by locals. There are also some pre-historic paintings drawn by Vedda people in a few rock caves of the temple premises.

Vihara inscriptions

Rock inscriptions set 1

Rock inscriptions set 2

References

Notes

 

Buddhist temples in Ampara District
Buddhist caves in Sri Lanka
Archaeological protected monuments in Ampara District
Sri Lanka inscriptions